Engenheiro Goulart is a train station on CPTM Lines 12-Sapphire and 13-Jade.

The building of Engenheiro Goulart station is located in the same place as the old one, in Avenida Doutor Assis Ribeiro, 169, in the district of Cangaíba, East Side of São Paulo. The original building was closed on 23 June 2014 and totally reconstructed, because of the Line 13-Jade construction, which has this station as terminus since 31 March 2018.

History
Engenheiro Goulart station was opened on 1 January 1934, along with the EFCB Poá station. In 1959, two commuter trains crashed after the head of the station authorized the departure of UP-237, which should wait for the passage of UP-240 on the station.

The station was reconstructed by RFFSA in 1970. Since 1994, it is operated by CPTM. Between 2008 and 2009, the station was reformed, extending the coverage above the platforms. In 2014, it was closed and demolished, to be reconstructed for Lines 12-Sapphire and 13-Jade.

On 31 March 2018, the Line 13-Jade was opened, with the boarding of retinue of Governor Geraldo Alckmin, towards Aeroporto–Guarulhos station. Not all the trains of Line 13 stop on Engenheiro Goulart, as the Airport-Express service makes a route from Luz to Aeroporto–Guarulhos.

Characteristics
Station constructed on surface with two adjacent island platforms. It has two access ramps, one of them connecting the station to Av. Doutor Assis Ribeiro, and another connecting the station to Tietê Ecological Park.

References

Companhia Paulista de Trens Metropolitanos stations
Railway stations opened in 1934
Railway stations opened in 2017
1934 establishments in Brazil